Trimble Knob, located southwest of Monterey, Virginia in Highland County, is a conical hill composed of basalt, a volcanic rock, of Eocene (early Tertiary) age. It is the eroded remnant of what was an active volcano or diatreme that last erupted approximately 35 million years ago, making it one of the youngest volcanos on the east coast of North America.

Description
Trimble Knob is an isolated conical hill in an otherwise relatively flat valley, surrounded by farmland. The peak of the hill has an elevation of 3123 ft (952m). U.S. Route 220 lies along the southeast flank of the hill.  Trimble Knob is the most obvious of many igneous intrusions in the area.

The basalt intrudes through the gently dipping Devonian Needmore Formation (fossiliferous shale and calcareous mudstone), and is near the axis of a syncline in the center of the valley.

Age
The basalt at Trimble Knob (and other igneous dikes in the area) was originally thought to be of Paleozoic age by relative age dating using cross-cutting relationships. In 1993, Southworth and others give a date of 35.0 ± 0.5 Ma for basalt of Trimble Knob In 2012, Bulas and others dated the eruption to 48.86±.37 million years ago. Both dates place the eruption during the Eocene epoch. The basalt intrudes the Devonian Millboro Shale.

Mole Hill, located in Rockingham County, is geologically similar to Trimble Knob and thought to be contemporaneous with it, along with other intrusive igneous rocks near Ugly Mountain in Pendleton County, West Virginia.

References

Landforms of Highland County, Virginia
Diatremes of the United States
Volcanoes of Virginia
Eocene volcanoes